John Melville is the name of:

 John Melville (1902-1986), British painter
 John Melville (cricketer) (1895-1951), Scottish cricket player
 John Melville of Raith (died 1548), Scottish laird
 John Melville, 3rd Lord Melville (died 1643) - see Earl of Melville
 John David Melville, 12th Earl of Leven, 11th Earl of Melville (1886–1913) - see Earl of Leven
 John Melville of Glenbervie (died c. 1420), Scottish sheriff and murder victim
 Sir John Melville (1803-1860) Lord Provost of Edinburgh